The Ministry of Justice of the United Arab Emirates was created in 1971, shortly after the federal government was established. The ministry oversees the court system of the United Arab Emirates and any associated prosecutorial services. Other responsibilities include appointing judges and providing licenses to attorneys, translators, and legal experts.

List of ministers 
 Abdullah Omran Taryam (1971-1972) [1st Minister of Justice]
 Ahmad ibn Sultan al-Qasimi (1972-1976)
 Muhammed 'Abd Al-Rahman Al-Bakr (1977-1983)
 Abdallah Hamid Al-Mazrui (1984-1989)
 Muhammed bin Ahmad bin Hasan Al-Khazraji (1990) [referred to as the Minister of Justice & Islamic Affairs]
 Abdullah Omran Taryam (1990-1997) 
 Muhammed Nakhira Al-Dhahiri (1997-2008)
 Hadef Joua'an Al Dhahiri (2008-2013)
 Sultan Saeed Al Badi (2014– )
 Abdullah bin Sultan bin Awad al Nuaimi

See also 
 Justice ministry
 Politics of the United Arab Emirates

References 

Justice ministries
Government of the United Arab Emirates